The National Center for Health Research (formerly known as the National Research Center for Women & Families) is a Washington, D.C.-based non-profit organization founded in 1999, providing health-related services such as providing free information and training based on research findings; educating policy makers and working with the media. The President of the organisation is Diana Zuckerman.  The primary program is The Cancer Prevention and Treatment Fund, which utilises an online health hotline.

In 2014, the organisation changed its name from the National Research Center for Women & Families to the National Center for Health Research.

Research 

In February 2011, Center staff published a study in Archives of Internal Medicine, which evaluated the Food and Drug Administration (FDA)’s recalls of devices that the agency considered potentially deadly or otherwise very high risk.  Using FDA data, the authors determined that most of the devices that were high-risk recalls had never been studied in clinical trials prior to FDA approval, and that the FDA needed to use more stringent criteria for implanted medical devices and those used to diagnose serious illnesses, and an editorial in the same issue agreed.  The study resulted in a hearing in the U.S. House of Representatives four days later and major U.S. newspapers and network news programs, where device industry representatives argued that clinical trials were not needed and the cost of doing the studies would interfere with job growth and innovation.

In April 2011, president Diana Zuckerman testified before the U.S. Senate Special Committee on Aging about the study findings.

In 2014, the organisation published a study in the JAMA Internal Medicine journal about the scientific evidence submitted to the FDA to support the marketing of implanted medical devices under the agency’s 510(k) review process.  The study concluded that most implanted devices were not required to submit data from clinical trials or scientific evidence of safety or effectiveness before they could be sold.

In 2016, a study was published in the same journal about recently approved cancer drugs that had been criticized by other researchers as having no evidence that they decreased mortality or helped patients live longer.  The Center’s follow-up study found no new evidence that any of the drugs affected survival, and only one of the drugs had clear evidence of improving patients’ quality of life.  The study also found that the cost of the drugs ranged from $20,000 to $180,000 despite the lack of scientific evidence of benefit.

In 2017, staff published a paper in Milbank Quarterly criticizing the FDA for its failure to safeguard electronic health records and other device software from hacking and other cybersecurity threats. They stated “ current regulations are necessary but not sufficient for ensuring patient safety by identifying and eliminating dangerous defects in software currently on the market”. They added that legislative changes resulting from the law entitled the 21st Century Cures Act “will further deregulate health IT, reducing safeguards that facilitate the reporting and timely recall of flawed medical software that could harm patients.”

The center published another study in Milbank Quarterly in 2018 called “Diversity in Medical Device Clinical Trials: Do We Know What Works for Which Patients?”. The study investigated whether new, high-risk medical devices had been proven safe and effective for women, minorities, or patients over 65 years of age.  Despite a law encouraging diversity in clinical trials submitted to the FDA, the results indicated that most studies did not conduct subgroup analyses on all these major demographic groups, thus providing no information about safety or effectiveness for most patients.

Awards 
Two awards are given by the center each year:
 The Foremother Lifetime Achievement Award "recognizes women who expanded women’s horizons, improved our communities, and made remarkable contributions to our country".
 The Health Policy Heroes Award "honors men and women (and sometimes boys and girls) who have changed the public debate and public policies in ways that help to improve the lives of adults and children nationwide".

Publications

References

External links
 

Non-profit organizations based in Washington, D.C.
Women's organizations based in the United States